Sigala (born 1992) is a British DJ and music producer.

Sigala may also refer to:


Places
Sigala, Hiiu County, Estonia, a village
 Sigala, a beach town in Hurghada, Egypt

People
 Massimo Sigala (born 1951), Italian racecar driver
 Pascual Sigala (born 1968), Mexican politician
 Alejandro Gomez Sigala (born 1960), Venezuelan equestrian competitor

Other uses
 Sigala, title character and recipient of the Sigalovada Sutta in Buddhism

See also
 Château Sigalas-Rabaud or Château Rabaud-Sigalas, French wine producer
 Giorgos Sigalas (born 1961), Greek basketball player